Mike R. Vining (born August 12, 1950) is a retired sergeant major in the United States Army, who was one of the first members of Delta Force. He joined the Army in 1968, and served until 1999.

Early life 
Mike Vining was born on August 12, 1950 in Greenville, Michigan, to Roger and Arlene Vining. When he was in high school, he saw news of the Tet Offensive, which inspired him to join the military. He graduated from Tri-County High School in 1968 and enlisted in the United States Army the same year.

Military career 
Vining completed the Army's explosive ordnance disposal (EOD) program before being sent to Vietnam in 1970. He served in the 99th Ordnance Detachment for a year before being honorably discharged. While in Vietnam, he was awarded the Bronze Star for "meritorious service in ground operations and EOD duties". In 1973, he rejoined the Army, serving as an EOD specialist in the 63rd Ordnance Detachment at Fort Leonard Wood. In 1978, he was assigned to Delta Force, a newly formed unit of which he was its first EOD specialist. Vining served in Delta until 1985, taking part in Operation Eagle Claw and Operation Urgent Fury. From 1985-1986, he was assigned to the 176th Ordnance Detachment in Alaska, before being brought back to Delta from 1986-1992, taking part in the Gulf War, Operation Uphold Democracy, and serving as an explosives expert during the 1996 Khobar Towers bombing. He retired from the military in January 1999.

Later career 
Vining has a Bachelor of Science in sociology from the State University of New York, and he has worked as a historian for the National EOD Association and the EOD Warrior Foundation. He has also written articles on naval post history, for which he received the Joseph M. Hale Award for excellence in research. In 1991, Vining became a member of the Universal Ship Cancellation Society, and served as its director from 2007-2009.

In 2018, he was inducted into the United States Army Ordnance Corps hall of fame.

Awards and decorations
SGM Vining earned the following throughout his military career:

Personal life 
Vining lives with his wife, Donna Ikenberry, a freelance photojournalist, in South Fork, Colorado. They have two children, named Terri and Lorri.

References

External links 
 US Military Service Tribute to Mike Vining
1950 births
Living people
People from Greenville, Michigan
United States Army personnel of the Vietnam War
United States Army personnel of the Gulf War
State University of New York alumni
United States Army non-commissioned officers